Aadyakiranangal is a 1964 Indian Malayalam-language film, directed and produced by P. Bhaskaran. The film stars Sathyan, Madhu, Ambika and K. R. Vijaya, with a musical score by K. Raghavan. The film won National Film Award for Best Feature Film in Malayalam. It was based on a novel by K. E. Mathai.

Cast
 
Sathyan as Kunjukutty 
Madhu as Pappachan 
Ambika as Gracy 
K. R. Vijaya as Marykutty 
Adoor Bhasi as Krishnan Ashan 
Jose Prakash as Damodaran 
P. J. Antony as Kariyachan 
T. R. Omana as Pennukunju 
Gopi
Thoppil Bhasi as Pulayan 
Adoor Pankajam as Kunjeli 
Bahadoor as Velu 
Elizabeth as Eliyamma 
Haji Abdul Rahman as Appukuttan 
Kambissery Karunakaran as Kuttichan 
Kedamangalam Ali as Kuriachan 
Kunjandi as Paappi 
Kuthiravattam Pappu 
Master Ajith P Bhaskaran as Joyimon 
Philomina as Annamma 
S. P. Pillai as Avaran 
Sunny as Sunny 
Vasu Pradeep as Thevan

Soundtrack
The music was composed by K. Raghavan and the lyrics were written by P. Bhaskaran.

References

External links
 

1964 films
1960s Malayalam-language films
Films based on Indian novels
Films with screenplays by Thoppil Bhasi
Best Malayalam Feature Film National Film Award winners
Films directed by P. Bhaskaran